The 2008 Constitution of Maldives designates Sunni Islam as the state religion. Only Sunni Muslims are allowed to hold citizenship in the country and citizens may practice Sunni Islam only. Non-Muslim citizens of other nations can practice their faith only in private and are barred from evangelizing or propagating their faith. All residents are required to teach their children the Muslim faith. The president, ministers, parliamentarians, and chiefs of the atolls are required to be Sunni Muslims. Government regulations are based on Islamic law. Only certified Muslim scholars can give fatawa.

, freedom of religion remained significantly restricted. Individual societal abuses and discrimination based on religious beliefs or practices have been reported. According to many officials and interlocutors, most citizens regarded Islam as one of their society's most distinctive characteristics and believed that having it established as the state religion promotes harmony and national identity. Since 2014, apostasy from Islam has been punishable by death.

Religions demography

The country has an area of  distributed across 1,200 coral atolls and islands, with a population of around 450,000.

The population is a distinct ethnic group with historical roots in South Indian, Sinhalese, and Arab communities . The vast majority of the Muslim population practices Sunni Islam.

Non-Muslim foreigners, including more than 500,000 tourists who visit annually (predominantly Europeans and Japanese) and approximately 54,000 foreign workers (mainly Pakistanis, Sri Lankans, Indians, and Bangladeshis), are in general allowed to practice their religions only in private. Although Muslim tourists and Muslim foreign workers are allowed to attend local mosque services, most practice Islam in private or at mosques located at the resorts where they work and live.

Status of religious freedom

Legal and policy framework
Freedom of religion is significantly restricted. 
"The 1997 Constitution designates Islam as the official state religion, and the Government interprets this provision to impose a requirement that all citizens must be Muslims."

In addition, "many citizens, at all levels, understand the Constitution as requiring all Maldivians to be Sunni Muslim. The Constitution also stipulates that the President must be Sunni Muslim and has the "supreme authority to propagate the tenets of Islam."

"Chapter II of the Constitution relating to the fundamental rights and duties of citizens does not provide for the right to freedom of religion or belief. Furthermore, the Constitution precludes non-Muslims from voting, obtaining citizenship, and holding public positions."

"The 'Law on the Protection of the Religious Unity' states that both the Government and the people must protect religious unity. Any statement or action contrary to this law is subject to criminal penalty; if found guilty, sentences range from a fine to imprisonment," and in extreme cases, capital punishment.
 
"The Government follows civil law based on Shari'a, in such a way that civil law is subordinate to Shari'a. Thus, in the event that a situation is not covered by civil law, as well as in certain cases such as divorce and adultery, Shari'a is applied."

"Non-Muslim foreign residents are allowed to practice their religions only if they do so privately, and provided that they do not encourage local citizens to participate."

"Foreigners were not allowed to import any items deemed "contrary to Islam," including alcohol, pork products, or idols for worship. Alcoholic beverages were available to tourists on resort islands, but it remains against the law to offer alcohol to a local citizen."

"Mosques were not required to register with the Government. The Government maintained and funded most mosques" and Muslim holidays are generally national holidays.

"The primary responsibility of imams was to present Friday sermons. They used a set of government-approved sermons on a variety of topics and were not legally empowered to write sermons independently. No one, not even an imam, may publicly discuss Islam unless invited to do so by the Government. According to government officials, this rule was in place to maintain a moderate Islamic environment rather than a fundamentalist one."

"Men who wish to act as imams must sit for public exams and present their scores and credentials to the Supreme Council for Islamic Affairs, chaired by the Chief Justice. The Supreme Council is empowered to certify imams. However, if the Supreme Council denies certification, the petitioner can appeal to the Board of Education."

"Islamic instruction was a mandatory part of the school curriculum, and the Government funded the salaries of instructors of Islam. While Islamic instruction was only one component of the curriculum used in the majority of schools, there was one school which used Arabic as its medium of instruction and focused primarily on Islam. Many people who sought further religious education obtained it in Saudi Arabia, Pakistan, or other Islamic countries. Schools offered religious education for women; however, there were no female imams."

Religious conversions and persecution of individuals
In 2007, according to the U.S. State Department, "There were no reports of forced religious conversion, including of minor U.S. citizens who had been abducted or illegally removed from the United States, or of the refusal to allow such citizens to be returned to the United States."

In 2010, Ismail Mohamed Didi, a Maldivian atheist who was being investigated for his "lack of belief" and had sought asylum in Britain, allegedly committed suicide.

On 29 May 2010, Mohamed Nazim, a student of philosophy from a devout Muslim family, was at a public meeting in the Maldives discussing the subject of religion.  He declared at the meeting that his own comparative studies on philosophy had meant he could not accept Islam, and declared himself to be an atheist.  He was immediately arrested, under the pretext of saving him from being attacked for his beliefs by others at the meeting. After three days of intense counseling, he publicly converted back to Islam. Even so, the Maldivian Police submitted his case to their public prosecutors office as of 29 August 2010.

Death penalty for apostasy from Islam (along with certain other offenses) was incorporated into Maldivian law on 27 April 2014 for any person aged above 7 years.

Societal abuses and discrimination
According to the Special Rapporteur on Freedom of Religion or Belief's February 2007 report, "members of local congregations on some of the islands do not allow foreign manual laborers to attend the mosque." The government denied these allegations.

When the Special Rapporteur on Freedom of Religion or Belief visited the Maldives' only prison, she found non-Muslim prisoners "unable to perform their prayers due to the objections of their Maldivian cellmates." There were no accommodations made for Hindu prisoners with dietary restrictions.

The Special Rapporteur on Freedom of Religion or Belief also reported on the issue of women wearing headscarves. She received reports that women were being pressured to cover by relatives, other citizens, self-proclaimed preachers, or newly formed political parties. Furthermore, she was told that women began to cover after state-owned media reported that the 2004 tsunami was the "result of Maldivians failing to live in accordance with Islam." There was one report of a female student who was excluded from school for wearing a headscarf.

On Human Rights Day, 10 December 2011, protesters led by Ismail Khilath Rasheed, calling themselves ‘Silent Solidarity’, gathered at the Artificial Beach to protest religious intolerance in the Maldives. They were attacked and threatened.

The Centre for Civil and Political rights, based in Geneva, Switzerland, and the Human Rights Committee are working to establish new guidelines with the Maldivian government on human rights.
The Committee has welcomed the following legislative and institutional measures taken by the State: The removal by the Parliament, in 2008, of the gender bar on running for presidency; the enactment of the Anti-Domestic Violence Act, in April 2012. 
The July 27, 2012, Human Rights Committee report listed more recommendations and principal matters of concern and expressed hope that the Maldivan State Party would continue on its path for equal rights, freedom of religion, and decriminalization of same-sex relationships.

See also
Freedom of religion in Saudi Arabia
Buddhism in the Maldives
Christianity in the Maldives
History of the Maldives
Islam in Maldives
Religion in Saudi Arabia

References

Further reading
 United States Bureau of Democracy, Human Rights and Labor. "Maldives: International Religious Freedom Report 2007". This article incorporates text from this source, which is in the public domain.
 Maldives, Religious Practices

Maldives
Human rights in the Maldives
Religion in the Maldives